Hessisches Landesmuseum Darmstadt (HLMD) is a large multidisciplinary museum in Darmstadt, Germany. The museum exhibits Rembrandt, Beuys, a primeval horse and a mastodon under the slogan "The whole world under one roof". As one of the oldest public museums in Germany, it has  80,000 visitors every year and a collection size of 1.35 million objects. Since 2019,  has been director of the museum. It is one of the three Hessian State museums, in addition to the museums in Kassel and Wiesbaden. Similar institutions in Europe are the Universalmuseum Joanneum in Graz and the National Museum of Scotland in Edinburgh.

History
Art and natural history collections of the Landgraves of Hesse-Darmstadt have been established since the 17th century. The museum was founded on 12 July 1820 with the donation of the collections of Louis I, Grand Duke of Hesse. Initially located in the Baroque part of the Residential Palace Darmstadt, the museum moved in 1906 to a nearby new building. In 1937, 82 works of Modern art were confiscated during the Degenerate art campaign. In the Brandnacht (fire night) on 11 to 12 September 1944 the museum building was partly destroyed; it was reconstructed and reopened in 1955.

Building
The main building was begun in 1897 by Alfred Messel and inaugurated in 1906. The encyclopedic museum consists of several period rooms or experience spaces, a monumental entrance hall with the staircase in Palladian architecture, a Pompeian style wing (509 BC – 400 AD) for the ancient art, Romanesque corridors and chapels (900–1300) for the medieval treasure art, a Late Gothic hall (1350–1500) for the historical weapons, the Italian Renaissance Chiavenna room ( 1580) for the Princely Treasury and corresponding open courtyards. The large east-wing Baroque hall  with an imposing barrel vault is used for special exhibitions. This asymmetric agglomeration of architectural styles, according to the design philosophy "Form follows function", is embedded in a rather rigid grid. The south-east tower, containing the library, is based on the tower of an 18th century Baroque plan for the Residential Palace Darmstadt by Louis Remy de la Fosse, that was realized only partly.

Location
The museum is located between Residential Palace Darmstadt and the urban park .

Renovations and extensions
A large extension on the west side of the main building was designed by Reinhold Kargel, completed in 1984. , the controversial, confusing modern building extension houses the painting gallery with 400 paintings. After major €80-million renovations from 2007 onwards, it reopened on 13 September 2014. In its high-rise north wing, the museum houses the Art Nouveau/prehistory and early history, zoology/handicrafts, geology and modern/contemporary arts collections on floors one above the other. Cultural history is presented in the lower south wing.

Collections
The museum is especially noted for its art collection, including Pieter Brueghel the Elder's The Magpie on the Gallows, and one of the plaques from the Magdeburg Ivories ( 968).  There are also strong collections of Art Nouveau objects from several countries, and German, Dutch and Flemish paintings. Basis of the graphic collection are the works by Dürer and Rembrandt, bought by museum founder Louis I, Grand Duke of Hesse in 1803. Interested visitors can request original prints and drawings in the study room.

It also features an important natural history collection, with for instance fossils from the nearby Messel pit and a historic American mastodon skeleton ("Peale's mastodon") purchased by the Darmstadt naturalist Johann Jakob Kaup. Also notable are the reconstructions of eleven hominid busts and ten large-scale habitat dioramas.

The  Collection A Forest of Sculptures includes works of well-known international artists of the 20th century from Early Modern to Contemporary art, like Constantin Brâncuși, Alberto Giacometti, Max Ernst, Henry Moore, Tony Cragg, Hans Arp, Barbara Hepworth. Spierer donated the sculpture collection in 2004.

The museum owns 290 objects by Joseph Beuys in seven rooms (""), the world's largest complex of his works. Key works of the 1970 installation are expansive felt objects (1964–67), Fond III (layered felt and copper, 1969), Scenes from the Deer Hunt (big closet with compartments filled with many small objects, 1961) and Chair with Fat (1963). Beuys himself worked on the installation until his death. Richard Rijnvos wrote music to each of the seven rooms.

Gallery

Special exhibitions

 2002 Ausstellung Wüste Darmstadt
 2014 Ausstellung "Karl der Große 1200 Jahre Mythos und Wirklichkeit" 2014–2015 Darmstadt
 2015 Zwischen Aufklärung und Romantik : Zeichnungen, Aquarelle und Ölstudien aus der Gründungszeit des Hessischen Landesmuseums Darmstadt
 2015 Homo expanding worlds – originale Urmenschen-Funde aus fünf Weltregionen
 2016 Gestaltete Sehnsucht Reiseplakate um 1900
 2016 Tony Cragg: Unnatural selection
 2022 Remember Venice! Bernardo Bellotto zeichnet
 2023 Urknall der Kunst Moderne trifft Vorzeit

Controversies
 2020 Waste of money for provisional depot
 2022 Missing art treasures

See also
 16969 Helamuda
 Peale's Barber Farm Mastodon Exhumation Site
 Grand Duchy of Hesse

Films

References

Further reading
 
 
 
 
 
 
 
 
 
 

Architecture
 

Paintings
 
 
 

Paleontology and archaeology
 
 
 
 
 

Spierer Collection
 

Block Beuys

External links

  
 
 

Natural history museums in Germany
Museums in Darmstadt
Art museums and galleries in Germany
Museums established in 1820
1820 establishments in Germany
Buildings and structures in Germany destroyed during World War II